Michalis Grigoriou (born 19 December 1973) is a Greek professional football manager who is the current manager of Super League club Ionikos.

Playing career
Grigoriou played for Ethnikos Piraeus F.C. at club level, including two seasons in the Alpha Ethniki.

Honours

Manager
Fostiras
Delta Ethniki: 2006–07

References

External links
Michalis Grigoriou at Soccerway

1973 births
Living people
Greek football managers
Ethnikos Piraeus F.C. players
Ethnikos Piraeus F.C. managers
Panserraikos F.C. managers
Association football defenders
Footballers from Athens
Greek footballers
Atromitos F.C. managers